Becky Fischer (born May 31, 1951) is a Pentecostal children's pastor best known for her role in the 2006 documentary Jesus Camp.

Biography
Fischer is a third-generation Pentecostal on her father's side and a fourth-generation Pentecostal on her mother's side. Her grandfather was an ordained minister with the Assemblies of God for 75 years. She was a businesswoman in her native Bismarck, North Dakota for 23 years, the last eight as part-time children's pastor of her church. In 1999, she moved to North Wilkesboro, North Carolina to join Tasch Ministries International, a ministry that specializes in mission trips for children. After serving as a children's pastor for Rick Joyner's MorningStar Ministries in Wilkesboro, she returned to North Dakota to begin her own ministry, Kids in Ministry International.

She is the author of several Sunday School curricula for churches and the book Redefining Children's Ministry in the 21st Century<ref>Fischer, Becky (2005) Redefining Children's Ministry in the 21st Century </ref> and her own biographical review of her experiences during the filming of the movie Jesus Camp. Fischer rented facilities for the "Kids on Fire" summer camp in Devils Lake, North Dakota for four years. She also ran an FM radio station and a motel before going into her ministry.

Jesus Camp
Fischer was approached in 2004 by Heidi Ewing and Rachel Grady about filming her "Kids on Fire" camp outside Devils Lake, North Dakota, as well as portions of her "Changing the World through Prayer Conference" at Christ Triumphant Church in Lee's Summit, Missouri (a suburb of Kansas City), where Fischer is ordained.

When the film debuted at the Tribeca Film Festival in the summer of 2006, it generated controversy for overtly political subject matter. For example, in one scene shot at Christ Triumphant Church, a guest speaker brought a cardboard cutout of George W. Bush and asked several children assembled there to stretch their hands out toward him. Some press accounts suggested that the children were worshiping him.   
The laying on of hands and its derivative of stretching hands towards someone is a common practice in Pentecostal and Charismatic churches.

While somewhat uncomfortable with some elements of the final product (which led to accusations that she was indoctrinating children), Fischer has refused to disown the film. In fact, she has used it as a tool to publicize her ministry and its work. The camp, which was held once a year for three weeks, was discontinued to be replaced by other events.

Ministry
Fischer complains the average Sunday School is content to merely give children a roll-over of Bible stories for the first twelve years of their lives, causing them to lose interest in God and the church by their teen years, and opting out of the church culture as a result. She stated, "As a result, we have a crisis in Christianity resulting in as many as 70% of our own children leaving the Church and never returning." Her ministry explores ways to keep them engaged in their faith through adulthood.

Kids in Ministry International promotes supporting the nation of Israel and  Christian Zionism, a common practice within Evangelical churches in the United States.

Theology
Fischer's ministry is part of an "apostolic network" of charismatic churches and ministries known as Harvest International Ministries. This organization is an offshoot of the charismatic movement that believes in the existence of present-day apostles and prophets. The Kids in Ministry'' website includes teachings from prominent ministers, including Ted Haggard, Lou Engle, and Rick Joyner. Fischer's ministry also adheres to several Pentecostal traditions and teachings such as promoting glossolalia or speaking in tongues, spiritual warfare, healing the sick, prophecy, raising of the dead, and exorcism from demonic possession.

References

External links

Media Reports on Jesus Camp, TV, Radio, Print Reviews & Reports
Telegraph Magazine: Kindergarten of Christ, extensive article about Kids in Ministry
 MovieGuide Review by Dr. Ted Baehr
 FAQ About Jesus Camp, the Movie, by Becky Fischer

Living people
1951 births
American Pentecostal pastors
American Christian creationists
People from Bismarck, North Dakota